Robert Jackson (born 6 January 1949, Coventry, England) is an English rock musician most famous for being a member of Badfinger from 1974-75 and 1981-83, and of The Fortunes since 1995. He currently tours under the name Badfinger in the United Kingdom.

Career

Indian Summer and Ross
Jackson formed his first professional rock band, named Indian Summer, in 1969. The band released a debut album, Indian Summer, on Neon Records in 1971, but disbanded the following year in the wake of business difficulties. Jackson and bandmate Alan Ross decided to develop another band, named Ross, in 1973. The band released two albums on RSO Records: Ross in 1973, and The Pit and the Pendulum in 1974. Despite touring extensively in the United States with Eric Clapton, the band failed to capture an audience. Directly after completing studio sessions in Los Angeles, Jackson left the group.

Badfinger 1974
Badfinger was a British rock band that, in their most successful lineup, consisted of Pete Ham, Mike Gibbins, Tom Evans, and Joey Molland. The band evolved from an earlier group named The Iveys that was formed in 1961 by Ham, Ron Griffiths and David "Dai" Jenkins in Swansea, Wales. The Iveys were the first group signed by the Beatles' Apple label in 1968. Over the next five years the band recorded five albums for Apple and toured extensively, before they became embroiled in the chaos of Apple Records' dissolution. The band renamed themselves Badfinger and in 1969 Griffiths left and was replaced by Molland. In 1970, the band engaged American businessman Stan Polley to manage their commercial affairs.

Badfinger had four consecutive worldwide hits from 1970 to 1972: "Come and Get It" (written and produced by Paul McCartney), "No Matter What", "Day After Day" (produced by George Harrison) and "Baby Blue", the latter of which - in 2013 - made a resurgence onto the Billboard Hot Rock Songs chart at number 14 after it was featured in the finale of the television series Breaking Bad. Their song "Without You" has been covered many times, including a Billboard number one hit for Harry Nilsson.

After Apple Records folded, Badfinger signed to Warner Bros. Records, but Polley's financial machinations resulted in internal friction that soon caused Ham to quit Badfinger, to be replaced by Bob Jackson on keyboard and guitar, Ham rejoined and Molland then left the band instead. However, a lawsuit filed by Warner's music publishing arm against Polley over missing escrow account money led Warner to withdraw Badfinger's 1974 album Wish You Were Here from the market seven weeks after its release, which effectively cut off the band's income. Warner's then refused to accept (or pay the band for) Badfinger's next album, Head First (which was the final album that would feature Pete Ham and Tom Evans as Badfinger), because of the dispute with Polley, leaving the band destitute. Three days before his 28th birthday, on 24 April 1975, Ham committed suicide by hanging himself, leaving a note that included damning comments about Polley.

Over the next three years, the surviving members struggled to rebuild their personal and professional lives against a backdrop of lawsuits, which tied up the songwriters' royalty payments for years. The Badfinger albums Airwaves (1979) and Say No More (1981) (both of which excluded both Gibbins and Jackson) floundered, as Molland and Evans see-sawed between cooperation and conflict in their attempts to revive and capitalise on the Badfinger legacy. Having seen Ham's body after Ham's wife had called him, Evans reportedly never got over his friend's suicide, and was quoted as saying in darker moments, "I wanna be where he is." On 19 November 1983, Evans also took his own life by hanging.

The Dodgers
Badfinger disbanded following Peter Ham's suicide in 1975. Jackson remained in contact with Evans, and the two formed a band named The Dodgers in 1976. The Dodgers released a handful of singles and one album by 1977, but that year Jackson was released by the band following management problems.

The Searchers and The Byron Band
Jackson was hired by The Searchers in 1979, contributing to the group's tours and two subsequent album releases, The Searchers (1979) and Play For Today (1980). In 1980, Jackson and Mel Collins joined The Byron Band that had been formed by Uriah Heep's former lead singer. Jackson departed from the band in 1981, after the band recorded the album On The Rocks for Creole Records.

Badfinger 1982
Jackson reteamed with Tom Evans and Mike Gibbins in 1982 to form a new Badfinger lineup, touring and recording exclusively in the United States. However, Evans committed suicide in late 1983, upon which Jackson disbanded Badfinger. He later invited Joey Molland to join him and Gibbins for another Badfinger outing in 1984 for a specialty tour in the United States. Although well received, the lineup did not last. Jackson began concentrating on writing and recording, making home recordings for demonstration records but not touring.

The Fortunes
Jackson appeared on two CDs in the 1990s: 7 Park Avenue and Golders Green, adding parts to posthumous releases by Pete Ham. He was subsequently hired by The Fortunes in 1995, and he remained with the group off and on for the next ten years, releasing three albums and performing on several tours. On 18 May 2006, Jackson rejoined the Fortunes and has toured extensively with them ever since. The band's Past & Present theatre shows featured many Badfinger songs and anecdotes. Jackson played on several albums, and appeared in the United Kingdom, Australia, Dubai, Las Vegas, Hong Kong, Netherlands and Belgium. The band also successfully played the United Kingdom, the United States, Canada, Netherlands, and Sweden during 2009.

Other activities

In 2000, Jackson finally succeeded in getting Snapper Records to issue the 1974 recordings for the Badfinger album Head First, along with personal demos, as a double CD package. Various outings have included sessions alongside Pete Brown, Jack Bruce, Jeff Beck, Andy Fairweather Low, The Motors, and many others. Jackson and Tom Evans joined a side project, Cheetah, and performed at Mide Festival, France.

In 2013, Jackson organised and performed at the unveiling of the Pete Ham Blue Plaque for Swansea Council, celebrating the achievements of Ham and Badfinger.

Badfinger 2015
In 2015, Jackson formed another Badfinger lineup featuring Andy Nixon on guitar and vocals, Michael Healey on bass and vocals, and Ted Duggan on drums, which continues to tour to the present day.

Discography
Indian Summer by Indian Summer, 1971
Moon by Moon 1973
Ross by Ross, 1973
The Pit and the Pendulum by Ross, 1974
Head First by Badfinger, recorded 1974 (released 2000)
Love on the rebound by The Dodgers, 1978
The Searchers by The Searchers, 1979
Play for Today by The Searchers, 1980
On the Rocks by The Byron Band, 1981 
Spend My Nights in Armour by Pete Brown (with Jeff Beck & Jack Bruce), 1987
7 Park Avenue by Pete Ham (released 1997)
Golders Green by Pete Ham (released 1999)
Some Bridges by The Fortunes, 1999
The Fortunes...Live by The Fortunes, 2001
Heroes Never Die by The Fortunes, 2004
Play On by The Fortunes, 2008

References

External links
Badfinger Lineups 1974 
 Prisoners of Rock & Roll 
Tom Brennan 
Coventry Music Blog
Echo 
Jason Dale
Badfinger official website
The Fortunes official website

1949 births
Living people
Badfinger members
English keyboardists
English rock guitarists
Musicians from Coventry
English rock keyboardists
English rock singers
English male singer-songwriters
English male guitarists
20th-century English male singers
20th-century English singers
20th-century British guitarists
21st-century English male singers
21st-century English singers
21st-century British guitarists